Akwo Tarh Ayuk Taku (born 7 December 1992) is a Cameroonian footballer who plays as a midfielder.

Career
Taku first arrived in Europe from Cameroon as a 14-year-old, joining an academy in Germany. He then returned to Cameroon to play for Les Astres and Botafogo FC (Douala). During this time he was called up by Cameroon for the 2011 African Nations Championship, where he was the youngest player in the squad.

He then moved to Slovakia, where he played in the Slovak Super Liga for Dunajská Streda in the 2011–12 season, and also the second tier the following season after their relegation. He then moved to France, playing for local league side AFC Holnon Fayet and for US Roye-Noyon in Championnat National 2. He then briefly returned to Cameroon with Union Douala before moving to the Democratic Republic of Congo, where he played for FC Renaissance du Congo and AS Vita Club.

In 2019 Taku moved to England where he joined National League South side Maidstone United in August 2019 after a successful trial in pre-season. Head of football John Still said "Ayuk came to us last year but we couldn’t get his international clearance. It’s only just come through now. He’s been training with us - he’s probably not 100% fit, certainly not match fit - but he’s capable of magic things... He produces some unbelievable moments in training, he really does. We needed someone to come up with something and he has got that something. We need to get him properly fit as well but we thought we were that far away we might need a magic moment." He left the club in October to seek first-team football elsewhere after only two substitute appearances. He joined Isthmian League side Cheshunt the following month, where he made two appearances. In March 2020, he re-joined Maidstone after resolving a dispute with a former club. He scored on his return as a substitute against Welling United on 7 March 2020. He joined Akhisarspor in January 2021.

References

External links
 
 DAC Dunajská Streda profile
 
 

1992 births
Living people
Cameroonian footballers
Association football midfielders
Les Astres players
FC DAC 1904 Dunajská Streda players
US Roye-Noyon players
Union Douala players
FC Renaissance du Congo players
AS Vita Club players
Maidstone United F.C. players
Cheshunt F.C. players
Akhisarspor footballers
Elite One players
Slovak Super Liga players
Championnat National 2 players
Linafoot players
National League (English football) players
Isthmian League players
TFF First League players
Expatriate footballers in Slovakia
Expatriate footballers in France
Expatriate footballers in the Democratic Republic of the Congo
Expatriate footballers in England
Expatriate footballers in Turkey
Cameroonian expatriate footballers
Cameroonian expatriate sportspeople in Slovakia
Cameroonian expatriate sportspeople in France
Cameroonian expatriate sportspeople in the Democratic Republic of the Congo
Cameroonian expatriate sportspeople in England
Cameroonian expatriate sportspeople in Turkey
2011 African Nations Championship players
Cameroon A' international footballers